Galaxies Are Colliding is a 1992 Canadian-American comedy film written and directed by John Ryman and starring Dwier Brown and Kelsey Grammer in his feature film debut.

Cast
Dwier Brown as Adam
Susan Walters as Beth
Karen Medak as Margo
James K. Ward as Psycho
Kelsey Grammer as Peter
Rick Overton as Rex

Release
The film was released at the Cannes Film Festival on May 12, 1992.

Reception
Nisid Hajari of Entertainment Weekly graded the film a C- and wrote, "In the end, Brown reinforces a lesson that he should have learned in Scriptwriting 101: Anomie, by definition, is dull."

References

External links
 
 

1990s English-language films